Godfred F. "Fritz" Heinisch (June 22, 1900 – December 22, 1983) was an American football end in the National Football League Born in Racine, Wisconsin., Heinisch played for the Racine Legion/Tornadoes (1922–1923, 1926), the Kenosha Maroons (1924), and the Duluth Eskimos (1926).

References

1900 births
1983 deaths
Sportspeople from Racine, Wisconsin
Players of American football from Wisconsin
American football tight ends
Racine Legion players
Kenosha Maroons players
Duluth Eskimos players
Sportspeople from the Milwaukee metropolitan area